The Magnina are a subtribe of moths of the family Erebidae described by Michael Fibiger in 2008.

Taxonomy
The subtribe was originally described as the subfamily Magninae of the family Micronoctuidae.

Clades (former tribes) and genera
Magna clade Fibiger, 2008
Magna Fibiger, 2008
Basalia Fibiger, 2008
Palnissa Fibiger, 2008
Bilinea Fibiger, 2008
Brevis Fibiger, 2008
Faeculoides clade Fibiger, 2008
Rustica Fibiger, 2008
Indieditum Fibiger, 2008
Faeculoides Fibiger, 2008

References

Micronoctuini
Lepidoptera subtribes